Violetta Trofimovna Bovt (also Boft, 9 May 1927 – 22 April 1995) was an American-Soviet ballet dancer.

Biography
Bovt was born in Los Angeles, United States. In the 1930s, her father, a communist sympathizer, moved the family to the Soviet Union; he died in the early 1940s fighting at the World War II front near Leningrad.

In 1944, Bovt graduated from the Bolshoi Ballet Academy and started dancing at the Stanislavski and Nemirovich-Danchenko Theatre. Her roles included: 
Anne Page in The Merry Wives of Windsor by Viktor Oransky (1944)
Natasha in The Coast of Happiness by Antonio Spadavecchia (1948)
Esmeralda in La Esmeralda by Cesare Pugni (1950)
Odette-Odile in Swan Lake by Pyotr Ilyich Tchaikovsky (1953)
Jeanne d’Arc in Jeanne d’Arc by Nikolay Peyko (1957)
Lola in Lola by Sergei Vasilenko

Bovt never gave up her American citizenship. For this reason, she was not accepted as a permanent performer with the Bolshoi Ballet and Mariinsky Ballet, despite being a frequent guest star there. She was also not allowed to perform in the United States. She worked at the Stanislavski theatre for 42 years, 35 years as a dancer and 7 as a teacher. A biographical TV film Интервью, которого не было (Interview that never happened) about Bovt was produced in 1968. In 1986, when the Soviet borders became softer, Bovt moved to Columbus, Ohio, where she was hired by BalletMet.

References

1927 births
1995 deaths
20th-century American women
Honored Artists of the RSFSR
People's Artists of the RSFSR
People's Artists of the USSR
Recipients of the Order of the Red Banner of Labour
American emigrants to the Soviet Union
American ballerinas
Soviet ballerinas
20th-century American ballet dancers